Edwardstown railway station is located on the Seaford and Flinders lines.  Situated in the inner south-western Adelaide suburb of Edwardstown, it is 7.9 kilometres from Adelaide station.

History 

Edwardstown railway station was opened in 1913.

Edwardstown railway station once had a goods yard, where SteamRanger restored its centenary carriages when it was received from the State Transport Authority. It is of an island platform construction, with pedestrian access at the northern and southern ends and the railway tracks on either side to the east and west. The station is unattended and there are no facilities, other than a shelter shed and public address system. The Edwardstown branch of the Freemasons is responsible for maintaining the station's landscaping.

Services by platform

References

External links

Railway stations in Adelaide
Railway stations in Australia opened in 1913